The 1992–93 Idaho Vandals men's basketball team represented the University of Idaho during the 1992–93 NCAA Division I men's basketball season. Members of the Big Sky Conference, the Vandals were led by third-year head coach Larry Eustachy and played their home games on campus at the Kibbie Dome in Moscow, Idaho.

The conference tournament was held in Moscow for the first time in eleven years, but the Vandals lost by twelve points to Boise State in the final. Idaho had swept the season series, including a fifteen-point win in Boise the previous week before a conference record crowd 

At 24–8, Idaho was not selected by the National Invitational tournament, and their season ended.

Postseason results

|-
!colspan=6 style=| Big Sky tournament

References

External links
Sports Reference – Idaho Vandals: 1992–93 basketball season
Gem of the Mountains: 1993 University of Idaho yearbook – 1992–93 basketball season
Idaho Argonaut – student newspaper – 1993 editions

Idaho Vandals men's basketball seasons
Idaho
Idaho
Idaho